25th Anniversary Reunion is a live album by the Dave Brubeck Quartet recorded in 1976 at the Interlochen Arts Academy in Michigan (with one track from a later performance in Indiana) and released by the Horizon label.

Reception

Allmusic reviewer by Ken Dryden said "25th Anniversary Reunion marks a special event for the Dave Brubeck Quartet. ... Even though it had been eight years since the quartet last played together prior to the start of the tour, the musicians quickly regained their form".

Track listing
 "St. Louis Blues" (W. C. Handy) − 8:48
 "Three to Get Ready and Four to Go" (Dave Brubeck) − 5:42
 "African Times Suite: African Time/African Breeze/African Dance" (Eugene Wright) − 7:57
 "Salute to Stephen Foster" (Brubeck) − 5:54
 "Take Five" (Paul Desmond) − 9:31
 "Don't Worry 'bout Me" (Rube Bloom, Ted Koehler) − 6:45

Personnel
Dave Brubeck − piano
Paul Desmond − alto saxophone
Eugene Wright − bass
Joe Morello − drums

References 

Horizon Records live albums
Dave Brubeck live albums
1977 live albums